Didier Barra (1590 - 1656) was a French Renaissance painter.

Not much is known about Barra's life except through his works. He was born in Metz, but left for Italy in 1608. In Naples he was very successful, especially for his cityscapes. He primarily painted scenes featuring decrepit ruins or near-barren buildings in a nearly-surrealist, apparently post-apocalyptic landscape. Until the mid-twentieth century Barra's works were believed to be by one "Monsù Desiderio". However the works formerly attributed to Desiderio have since been identified as the work of at least three artists: Barra, François de Nomé, who was also from Metz, and a third, as yet unnamed painter. The similarities in both themes and style, and the fact that there were occasions where Barra and de Nomé collaborated, have made attributions challenging. One work executed by Barra Saint Standing in a Niche is part of the Courtauld Gallery collection. He died in Naples in 1656.

References

1590 births
1656 deaths
17th-century Italian painters
Italian male painters
French Renaissance painters
Artists from Metz